Strachowice is a neighborhood in Wrocław, Poland, located in the southwestern part of the city. Originally a village, it was included within the city limits of Wrocław in 1973.

The Copernicus Airport Wrocław is located in Strachowice.

History and etymology
Strachowice dates back to medieval Piast-ruled Poland. The oldest known mention of the village comes from a document from 1305. Its name is of Polish origin, and comes from the Polish word strach, which means "fear".

In the 18th century it was annexed by Prussia, and in 1871 it became part of Germany. In 1937, during a massive Nazi campaign of renaming of placenames, it was renamed to Schöngarten to erase traces of Polish origin. During World War II, the Germans operated the E182 forced labour subcamp of the Stalag VIII-B/344 prisoner-of-war camp in the settlement. Following the defeat of Germany in the war, in 1945, the village became again part of Poland and its historic name was restored.

In 1973 Strachowice was included in the city limits of Wrocław. Until 1990 it was a neighborhood (osiedle) in the south-western part of Wrocław, in the district of Fabryczna. Since 1990 part of the combined osiedle Jerzmanowo-Jarnołtów-Strachowice-Osiniec.

Climate

References

Districts of Wrocław